The flag of Amman is the flag of the city and municipality of Amman, Jordan. It is officially recognized by the Jordanian government. The foreground shows the word Amman written in Arabic in the Amman serif font, and in the background hills and houses. The flag was adopted by the greater municipality of Amman in 2009 along with a similar logo, replacing the old "Arch flag".

Gallery

References

Year of establishment missing
Culture in Amman
Amman
Amman
Amman